Sybra uenoi is a species of beetle in the family Cerambycidae. It was described by Hayashi in 1956. It is known from Japan.

Subspecies
 Sybra uenoi albodistincta Takakuwa, 1984
 Sybra uenoi sakamotoi (Hayashi, 1958)
 Sybra uenoi uenoi (Hayashi, 1956)

References

uenoi
Beetles described in 1956